Ponderosa State Park is a public recreation area and state park occupying a peninsula in Payette Lake on the northeast edge of McCall in Valley County, Idaho, United States. The park has hiking and biking trails, guided walks, evening programs, beaches, picnic areas, and opportunities for skiing, snowshoeing, and wildlife watching.

See also

 List of Idaho state parks
 National Parks in Idaho

References

External links
Ponderosa State Park Idaho Parks and Recreation
Ponderosa State Park Location Map Idaho Parks and Recreation

State parks of Idaho
Protected areas of Valley County, Idaho
Protected areas established in 1973